Martin Meylin ( Rhineland-Palatinate, then Prussia – , West Lampeter Township, Lancaster County, Pennsylvania) was a gunsmith best known for inventing Daniel Boone's Gun, the "Kentucky Long Rifle".

Personal life
In 1710, Martin Meylin left Zurich for Pequea in what is now Lancaster County, Pennsylvania together with a group of other Mennonites. He received 265 acres of land from the 10,000-acre plot granted by William Penn to settlers from the Palatinate.

Local histories state that Martin Meylin was either a gunsmith or blacksmith, and that Martin Meylin's son, Martin Meylin (II) also practiced these professions. As a result, the historical record is hard to parse, as it is not always clear which Meylin is being referred to in any given document.

The American rifle
Martin Mylin of Lancaster County is credited with the invention of the long rifle which later on became known as the "Pennsylvania Rifle" and also the "Kentucky Rifle" of pioneer fame. The "long rifle" is considered to be an important development by gun collectors, as it combined features of British rifling, Germanic style mechanisms, and included a particularly long barrel for great accuracy. The result was an effective, "distinctly American" weapon.

References

External links
 Martin Meylin (dgatx.com)
 Martin Meylin (ancestry.com)
 Meylin, Martin (american-firearms.com)
 Martin Meylin’s Gunshop
 Martin Meylin : a progenitor of the Pennsylvania rifle
 Historical Papers and Addresses of the Lancaster County Historical Society, Volume 14
 Historic Background and Annals of The Swiss and German Pioneer Settlers of Southeastern Pennsylvania
 FAMOUS VERY EARLY LANCASTER KENTUCKY GUN SIGNED “MARTIN MEILLIN IN GERMANTAUN 1705” POSSIBLY THE EARLIEST SIGNED AND DATED KENTUCKY.
 History of Lancaster County

1665 births
1749 deaths
Gunsmiths
17th-century inventors
18th-century inventors